The Kosons are the only gold coins that have been minted by the Dacians, named after the Greek alphabet inscription "ΚΟΣΩΝ" on them. It is thought that "Koson" is the name of an otherwise historically unrecorded Dacian king, though he may be identical to the Cotison mentioned by Horace and Suetonius.

Description

The coins contain Roman iconography: on the obverse, there is an eagle standing on a scepter and holding a wreath in their claw (inspired by the silver denarii issued by Pomponius Rufus); the reverse contains three men dressed in togas, two of them holding an axe on the shoulder (possibly inspired by the silver denarii issued by Marcus Junius Brutus in 54 BC).

Discovery
Coins inscribed KOSON were discovered in several large stashes in Transylvania. The biggest group was discovered in 1543, and contained several thousands coins and objects made of gold. It was rumored that this stash was revealed in a bolted chamber under the river Strei, identified as the river Sargetia, and also mentioned by Dio Cassius. Further research disproved this, and placed the treasure in one of the Dacian castles in the Orăştie mountains, probably in Sarmisegetusa.

Debate regarding the name "Koson" was prompted after the discovery of the coins. The discovery captured the attention of writers at the time. Thus, there are comments from Erasmus of Rotterdam in 1520  and Stephanus Zamosius (István Szamosközy) in 1593.

King theory
Modern scholars agree that the name Koson most likely refers to a local king about whom nothing else is known. Vasile Pârvan argues that he was probably a Thracian dynast who employed the Dacian Getae tribe in plundering raids across the Danube, paying them in his coins. Theodor Mommsen argued that Koson was probably a Dacian ally of Brutus, since the coins seem to derive their imagery from those minted by Brutus himself. Recent scholars often argue that he is very likely to be identical to the "Cotison" mentioned by Horace (Odes III., 8, 18,) and Suetonius, (Augustus, 63.), a Dacian king during the reign of Augustus who had raided over the Danube.

References

External links
 

Dacian kings
1st-century monarchs in Europe